Cavender's Store, which has also been known as Edwards' Store and The Brick, in Villanow, Georgia, is believed to be the oldest freestanding country store in the state of Georgia. It was listed on the National Register of Historic Places in 1992.

It is a one-story front-gabled, brick commercial structure made of hand-made bricks on a rock foundation. Its brick walls are
 thick, laid in American bond.  It has iron tie rods.

References

Commercial buildings on the National Register of Historic Places in Georgia (U.S. state)
Buildings and structures completed in 1840
National Register of Historic Places in Walker County, Georgia